WEVI (101.3 FM) is a radio station licensed to serve Frederiksted, U.S. Virgin Islands. The station is owned by Halima S. Roebuck, through licensee HSR Communications, LLC. It airs a Urban contemporary format that offers a mix of Hip Hop, R&B, Reggae, Dancehall Calypso, Soca and AfroBeats. It is branded as ROE FM 101.3.

The station has been assigned these call letters by the Federal Communications Commission since November 27, 2001.

Logos

References

External links
 

EVI
Radio stations established in 2001
2001 establishments in the United States Virgin Islands
Urban contemporary radio stations in the United States
Saint Croix, U.S. Virgin Islands